Nolden is a surname and given name of Dutch and German origin, originating as a patronymic from the surname Nolde. Notable people with the surname or given name include:

Surname
Michelle Nolden (born 1973), Canadian actress
Wes Nolden, American military officer and bishop

Given name
Nolden Gentry (born 1937), American basketball player

See also
Nolde (disambiguation)